The PHEDRA High Enthalpy low density Wind Tunnel, located at the ICARE Laboratory in Orléans, France, is a research facility used extensively for fundamental and applied research on non equilibrium plasma flows and planetary atmospheric entries. Its name is an acronym for soufflerie à Plasma Hors Equilibre de Rentreés Atmosphériques . Phedra wind tunnel takes part of the European Landscape Network portal MERIL.

History

PHEDRA (ex. SR5) wind tunnel was located in the Aerothermodynamics Laboratory from the CNRS (France's national scientific research center) in Meudon, France until 2000.
The wind tunnel was then moved to the ICARE Laboratory in Orleans, resulting from the merging of the Aerothermodynamics Laboratory and the LCSR (Combustion and Reactive Systems Laboratory). This facility is part of the experimental plateform FAST (Facilities for Aerothermodynamics & Supersonic Technologies, contact Viviana Lago head of FAST team, viviana.lago@cnrs-orlean.fr) belonging in ICARE Institut from CNRS, Orléans.

Technical details

PHEDRA is a plasma ground test facility used to simulate low pressure flight conditions in the upper layer of the planetary atmospheres.  An arc-jet generator operates in a cylindrical chamber of 1;1 m in diameter and 4.3 m length, pumped with 3 primary pumps and 3 Roots pumps, which capacity (27 000 m3/h) insures a residual pressure ranged between 1 and 100 Pa. Different working gases can be used like Argon, nitrogen,  Air, allowing the simulation of several planetary entry conditions like earth (80%-20%), Mars (97%-3%) or Titan (99% -1% ). The advantages of the home-made designed plasma source can be found in the stability of the plasma flow, the high specific enthalpy, up to 50 MJ/kg due to the low mass flow rate and the low rate of contamination which could provides from the erosion of the cathode.

Main features

 Continuous supersonic high enthalpy rarefied wind tunnel. 
 4.5m x 2.1 m test chamber
 Nozzle: conical 
 Adjustable pumping group, max capacity: 26 000 m3/h
 Static pressure, Pa:                               1 < Pstg < 3000
 Stagnation pressure, Pa:                     20 < Po < 120 105 
 Mach number:                                       2 < Mach < 8
 Averaged enthalpy, Mj/kg few < Ho < 50
 Working gas: , Air, Air and extensive mixtures

Instrumentation

Various types of diagnostics are associated to the wind tunnel PHEDRA: Pitot Probes, Pressure sensors for parietal measurements, Heat transfer gauges, Infrared thermography camera, iCCD camera, Electrostatic probes, Optical spectrometry (near IR, visible and VUV). They are employed for fundamental and applied studies in the fields of Compressible Aerodynamics, Aerothermodynamics, Atmospheric entries and Gas and Plasma Physics.

Purpose & use

The wind tunnel PHEDRA is extensively used for fundamental and applied research applied to planetary atmospheric entry 
Some works undertaken with this facility are listed here:
 Fundamental research of high enthalpy fluid dynamic phenomena in non-equilibrium flows
 Plasma dynamics
 Experimental data base on planetary atmospheric entries : MARS, EARTH, TITAN, VENUS
 Aerodynamic and aerothermal behavior of probes and models
 Plasma flow control with MHD. 
Atmospheric entry space debris

Gallery

References 

Wind tunnels
Buildings and structures in Orléans